The Never Ending Tour is the popular name for Bob Dylan's endless touring schedule since June 7, 1988.

Background
The 2012 leg of the Never Ending tour was announced via BobDylan.com on February 16, 2012. The first dates to be announced were concerts taking place in three South American Countries; Brazil, Argentina and Chile. Dylan previously visited these countries last time he toured South America on the Never Ending Tour 2008. On March 15, 2012, after being rumored in the press, it was confirmed that Dylan would perform in Heredia, Costa Rica on May 5, 2012. This was Dylan's first concert in the country of Costa Rica and his first concert in Central America. On March 28, 2012 it was confirmed that Dylan would return to Mexico, four years after his last performances there in 2008.

It was confirmed on March 27, 2012 that Dylan would return to Kent in 2012 to headline the Hop Farm Festival. Dylan had previously headlined the festival in July 2010. On March 29, 2012 Dylan's official website revealed several European concerts for the summer of 2012. These dates included official confirmation of his performances at Hop Farm Festival, Festival Internacional Benicàssim and Festival Vieilles Charrues Les Nuits de Fourvière. It was revealed that Dylan also performed at the Montreux Jazz Festival in Switzerland. Dylan also performed in Salzburg, Austria and Nîmes, France.

Dylan performed at eleven European concerts this summer including: his second performance at The Hop Farm Festival in Kent, the Citadel Music Festival in Berlin, Kunst!Rasen Gronau in Bonn, Lieder im Schloss in Bad Mergentheim, the Montreux Jazz Festival in Switzerland, Festival Internacional de Benicàssim in Spain, Festival Jardins de Cap Roig in Calella, Festival de Nîmes in France, Collisioni 2012 in Barolo, Les Nuits de Fourvière in Lyon and the Vieilles Charrues Festival in Carhaix.

Rehearsals for Dylan's 2012 European tour began at the Bardavon 1869 Opera House in Poughkeepsie, New York on Monday June 25, 2012 and lasted until Wednesday June 27, 2012 where Dylan and his band flew to England for his performance at Hop Farm Festival on Saturday June 30, 2012. Among unknown tunes Dylan and his band performed "Things Have Changed", "Nettie Moore", "Tangled Up in Blue", "Blind Willie McTell" and "Ballad of Hollis Brown". Dylan's performance at the Hop Farm Music Festival saw the introduction of a grand piano into his set, which he played for eight songs of his sixteen-song set.

On June 15, 2012, Dylan's official website announced eleven concerts that are to take place in August and September 2012. These shows include three concerts in Canada, where Dylan hadn't performed since November 2009. The following day a further two concerts were announced, one taking place in Billings, Montana and the other taking place in Rochester, Minnesota. On June 20 another two concerts were announced, one in Cincinnati and the other in Salisbury, Maryland. The tickets for Dylan's show in Cranbrook sold out in record time. The venue adjusted the position of the stage to add a further 250 tickets, which also sold out. On June 28, 2012 a further six concerts were announced taking place in August and early September. The August 15 concert in Billings, Montana was eventually cancelled due to poor ticket sales.

The much anticipated North American leg of the Dylan/Knopfler tour was announced via both BobDylan.com and MarkKnopfler.com on July 18, 2012, just one day after Dylan announced his 35th studio album, Tempest. The tour was met with a mixed to negative response. Many reviews complained about Dylan's decreasing vocal abilities and his lack of piano playing skills. As usual with Dylan reviews the press complained about Dylan's changing of song, beyond recognition sometimes. The tour's attendance was fairly poor with many reviews reporting fans leaving long before the concert was over. In an unprecedented move during his November 5 concert in Madison, Wisconsin, Dylan addressed the crowd, besides his normal band introduction and said: "We tried to play good tonight since the president was here today. Don't believe the media. I think it's going to be a landslide"

Performing only 86 concerts in 2012, Dylan performed the fewest shows during a year-long leg of the Never Ending Tour since 1996.

Supporting acts
Chicago Blues: A Living History — July 8, 2012
Garbage — July 22, 2012
Gossip — July 22, 2012
Leon Russell — August 26, 2012
The McCrary Sisters — August 26, 2012, The McCrary Sisters provided backing vocals on Blowin' in the Wind at this event
Ben Harper — September 2, 2012
Bob Weir — September 9, 2012
Mark Knopfler — October 5 – November 21, 2012

Tour dates

Festivals and other miscellaneous performances

Cancellations and rescheduled shows

Box office score data

Setlists

First Leg

{{hidden
| headercss = background: #D8BFD8; font-size: 100%; width: 100%;
| contentcss = text-align: left; font-size: 100%; width: 100%;
| header = April 17
| content =
"Leopard-Skin Pill-Box Hat"
"Don't Think Twice, It's All Right"
"Things Have Changed"
"Tangled Up In Blue"
"Beyond Here Lies Nothin'"
"Simple Twist Of Fate"
"Summer Days"
"Spirit On The Water"
"Honest With Me"
"A Hard Rain's A-Gonna Fall"
"Highway 61 Revisited"
"Blind Willie McTell"
"Thunder On The Mountain"
"Ballad Of A Thin Man"
"Like A Rolling Stone
"All Along The Watchtower"
Encore
"Rainy Day Women #12 & 35"
}}

{{hidden
| headercss = background: #D8BFD8; font-size: 100%; width: 100%;
| contentcss = text-align: left; font-size: 100%; width: 100%;
| header = April 19
| content =
"Leopard-Skin Pill-Box Hat"
"It's All Over Now, Baby Blue"
"Things Have Changed"
"Tangled Up In Blue"
"Beyond Here Lies Nothin'"
"Spirit On The Water"
"High Water (For Charley Patton)"
"Desolation Row"
"Honest With Me"
"Simple Twist Of Fate"
"Highway 61 Revisited"
"Man In The Long Black Coat"
"Thunder On The Mountain"
"Ballad Of A Thin Man"
"Like A Rolling Stone"
"All Along The Watchtower"
Encore
"Rainy Day Women #12 & 35"
}}

{{hidden
| headercss = background: #D8BFD8; font-size: 100%; width: 100%;
| contentcss = text-align: left; font-size: 100%; width: 100%;
| header = April 21
| content =
"Leopard-Skin Pill-Box Hat"
"Don't Think Twice, It's All Right"
"Things Have Changed"
"Tangled Up In Blue"
"Beyond Here Lies Nothin'"
"Make You Feel My Love"
"Honest With Me"
"Every Grain Of Sand"
"The Levee's Gonna Break"
"A Hard Rain's A-Gonna Fall"
"Highway 61 Revisited"
"Love Sick"
"Thunder On The Mountain"
"Ballad Of A Thin Man"
"Like A Rolling Stone"
"All Along The Watchtower"
Encore
"Blowin' In The Wind"
}}

{{hidden
| headercss = background: #D8BFD8; font-size: 100%; width: 100%;
| contentcss = text-align: left; font-size: 100%; width: 100%;
| header = April 22
| content =
"Leopard-Skin Pill-Box Hat"
"It Ain’t Me Babe"
"Things Have Changed"
"Tangled Up In Blue"
"Beyond Here Lies Nothin'"
"Not Dark Yet"
"Summer Days"
"Simple Twist Of Fate"
"High Water (For Charley Patton)"
"Tryin’ To Get To Heaven"
"Highway 61 Revisited"
"Forgetful Heart"
"Thunder On The Mountain"
"Ballad Of A Thin Man"
"Like A Rolling Stone"
"All Along The Watchtower"
Encore
"Blowin In The Wind"
}}

{{hidden
| headercss = background: #D8BFD8; font-size: 100%; width: 100%;
| contentcss = text-align: left; font-size: 100%; width: 100%;
| header = April 24
| content =
"Leopard-Skin Pill-Box Hat"
"It's All Over Now, Baby Blue"
"Things Have Changed"
"Tangled Up In Blue"
"Beyond Here Lies Nothin'"
"Simple Twist Of Fate"
"John Brown"
"Summer Days"
"Desolation Row"
"Blind Willie McTell"
"Highway 61 Revisited"
"Love Sick"
"Thunder On The Mountain"
"Ballad Of A Thin Man"
"Like A Rolling Stone"
"All Along The Watchtower"
Encore
"Blowin' In The Wind"
}}

{{hidden
| headercss = background: #D8BFD8; font-size: 100%; width: 100%;
| contentcss = text-align: left; font-size: 100%; width: 100%;
| header = April 26
| content =
"Leopard-Skin Pill-Box Hat"
"It Ain't Me, Babe"
"Things Have Changed"
"Tangled Up In Blue"
"Beyond Here Lies Nothin'"
"Trying To Get To Heaven"
"High Water (For Charley Patton) "
"Spirit On The Water"
"The Levee's Gonna Break"
"A Hard Rain's A-Gonna Fall"
"Highway 61 Revisited"
"Love Sick"
"Thunder On The Mountain"
"Ballad Of A Thin Man"
"Like A Rolling Stone"
"All Along The Watchtower"
Encore
"Blowin' In The Wind"
}}

{{hidden
| headercss = background: #D8BFD8; font-size: 100%; width: 100%;
| contentcss = text-align: left; font-size: 100%; width: 100%;
| header = April 27
| content =
"Leopard-Skin Pill-Box Hat"
"Girl From The North Country"
"Beyond Here Lies Nothin'"
"Tangled Up In Blue"
"Honest With Me"
"Desolation Row"
"Cry A While"
"Make You Feel My Love"
"The Levee's Gonna Break"
"Love Sick"
"Highway 61 Revisited"
"Simple Twist Of Fate"
"Thunder On The Mountain"
"Ballad Of A Thin Man"
"Like A Rolling Stone"
"All Along The Watchtower"
Encore
"Blowin' In The Wind"
}}

{{hidden
| headercss = background: #D8BFD8; font-size: 100%; width: 100%;
| contentcss = text-align: left; font-size: 100%; width: 100%;
| header = April 28
| content =
"Leopard-Skin Pill-Box Hat"
"To Ramona"
"Beyond Here Lies Nothin'"
"Tangled Up In Blue"
"Summer Days"
"Not Dark Yet"
"Jolene"
"Ballad Of Hollis Brown"
"A Hard Rain's A-Gonna Fall"
"The Lonesome Death Of Hattie Carroll"
"Highway 61 Revisited"
"Forgetful Heart"
"Thunder On The Mountain"
"Ballad Of A Thin Man"
"Like A Rolling Stone"
"All Along The Watchtower"
Encore
"Blowin' In The Wind"
}}

{{hidden
| headercss = background: #D8BFD8; font-size: 100%; width: 100%;
| contentcss = text-align: left; font-size: 100%; width: 100%;
| header = April 30
| content =
"Leopard-Skin Pill-Box Hat"
"Man In The Long Black Coat"
"Things Have Changed"
"Tangled Up In Blue"
"Rollin' and Tumblin'"
"Spirit On The Water"
"Summer Days"
"Desolation Row"
"High Water (For Charley Patton)"
"Simple Twist Of Fate"
"Highway 61 Revisited"
"Blind Willie McTell"
"Thunder On The Mountain"
"Ballad Of A Thin Man"
"Like A Rolling Stone"
"All Along The Watchtower"
Encore
"Blowin' In The Wind"
}}

{{hidden
| headercss = background: #D8BFD8; font-size: 100%; width: 100%;
| contentcss = text-align: left; font-size: 100%; width: 100%;
| header = May 2
| content =
"Leopard-Skin Pill-Box Hat"
"It Ain't Me, Babe"
"Things Have Changed"
"Tangled Up In Blue"
"Beyond Here Lies Nothin'"
"Desolation Row"
"Cry A While"
"Trying To Get To Heaven"
"The Levee's Gonna Break"
"Simple Twist Of Fate"
"Highway 61 Revisited"
"Love Sick"
"Thunder On The Mountain"
"Ballad Of A Thin Man"
"Like A Rolling Stone"
"All Along The Watchtower"
Encore
"Blowin' In The Wind"
}}

{{hidden
| headercss = background: #D8BFD8; font-size: 100%; width: 100%;
| contentcss = text-align: left; font-size: 100%; width: 100%;
| header = May 5
| content =
"Leopard-Skin Pill-Box Hat"
"Don't Think Twice, It's All Right"
"Beyond Here Lies Nothin'"
"Tangled Up In Blue"
"Summer Days"
"Not Dark Yet"
"Jolene"
"Ballad Of Hollis Brown"
"A Hard Rain's A-Gonna Fall"
"The Lonesome Death Of Hattie Carroll"
"Highway 61 Revisited"
"Love Sick"
"Thunder On The Mountain"
"Ballad Of A Thin Man"
"Like A Rolling Stone"
"All Along The Watchtower"
Encore
"Rainy Day Women #12 & 35"
"Blowin' In The Wind"
}}

{{hidden
| headercss = background: #D8BFD8; font-size: 100%; width: 100%;
| contentcss = text-align: left; font-size: 100%; width: 100%;
| header = May 7
| content =
"Leopard-Skin Pill-Box Hat"
"Man In The Long Black Coat"
"Things Have Changed"
"Tangled Up In Blue"
"Cry A While"
"Spirit On The Water"
"Summer Days"
"Desolation Row"
"High Water (For Charley Patton)"
"Simple Twist Of Fate"
"Highway 61 Revisited"
"Blind Willie McTell"
"Thunder On The Mountain"
"Ballad Of A Thin Man"
"Like A Rolling Stone"
"All Along The Watchtower"
Encore
"Blowin' In The Wind"
}}

Second Leg

Third Leg

Fourth Leg

Song Count

Band
Bob Dylan – Guitar, Harmonica, Organ, Piano, Vocals   
Tony Garnier – Electric bass, Upright bass
Donnie Herron – Banjo, Electric mandolin, Lap steel, Pedal steel, Viola, Violin 
Stu Kimball – Guitar
George Recile – Drums, percussion
Charlie Sexton – Guitar

References

External links
BobLinks – Comprehensive log of concerts and set lists
BobDylan.com – Bob Dylan's Official Website Tour Page
Bjorner's Still on the Road – Information on recording sessions and performances

Bob Dylan concert tours
2012 concert tours